The Democratic Party of Guinea-African Democratic Rally (Parti Démocratique de Guinée-Rassemblement Démocratique Africain) is a political party in Guinea that dominated Guinean politics under a one-party state system. The party was founded as a branch of the African Democratic Rally (RDA) in June 1947. On 19 October 1958 the party severed its links with the RDA, other members of which supported a closer union with France. The party's leader, Ahmed Sékou Touré, became the country's first president. Two years later, he declared the PDG to be the sole legal party in the country. As president of the PDG, Touré was the only candidate for president of the republic, and as such was elected unopposed to four seven-year terms.  Every five years, a single list of PDG candidates was returned to the National Assembly.  After the death of Touré and a coup staged by Lansana Conté in 1984, the PDG was dissolved.

In 1992 PDG-RDA was revived under the leadership of Ismael Gushein. In the parliamentary election held on 30 June 2002, the party won 3.4% of the popular vote and 3 out of 114 seats.

Electoral history

Presidential elections

National Assembly elections

See also 
African Democratic Party of Guinea

References

1947 establishments in French West Africa
African and Black nationalist parties in Africa
African socialist political parties
Pan-Africanist political parties in Africa
Parties of one-party systems
Political parties established in 1947
Political parties in French West Africa
Political parties in Guinea
Sections of the Rassemblement Démocratique Africain
Socialism in Guinea
Socialist parties in Africa